Kurt Feltz (14 April 1910 in Krefeld, Germany – 3 August 1982 in Mallorca, Spain) was a highly prolific German poet and song lyricist.

Selected filmography
...und die Musik spielt dazu (1943, based on Season in Salzburg)
Lascia cantare il cuore (Italy, 1943, based on Season in Salzburg)
Saison in Salzburg (1952, based on Season in Salzburg)
Die Perle von Tokay (1954, based on Die Perle von Tokay)
Bonjour Kathrin (1956, based on Die glücklichste Frau der Welt)
 Peter Shoots Down the Bird (1959)
Saison in Salzburg (1961, based on Season in Salzburg)

Screenwriter
Falstaff in Vienna (1940)

External links
GEMA — Gesellschaft für musikalische Aufführungs- und mechanische Vervielfältigungsrechte (Association for Musical Recording and Mechanical Reproduction Rights) – the German equivalent of the U.S. RIAA

1910 births
1982 deaths
People from Krefeld
People from the Rhine Province
German songwriters
20th-century German musicians